Uno Tölpus (14 August 1928 Kunda – 11 August 1964 Käsmu) was an Estonian architect. He was one of the most notable Estonian architects in 1950s.

In 1952 he graduated from Tallinn Polytechnical Institute. From 1952 to 1964 he worked at the architectural bureau Eesti Projekt.

Works

 1958: Eesti Energia's building in Tallinn (with Peeter Tarvas)
 1963: Tallinn University Academic Library (with P. Madalik)
 Vanemuine Concert Hall (one of the designers)

References

1928 births
1964 deaths
20th-century Estonian architects
Tallinn University of Technology alumni
People from Kunda, Estonia